The Military Ridge State Trail is a  long, recreational rail trail in Wisconsin.

It connects the following communities:

 Dodgeville
 Ridgeway
 Barneveld
 Blue Mounds
 Mount Horeb
 Riley
 Klevenville
 Verona
 Fitchburg

The western end of the trail is on  just north of the intersection with King Street in Dodgeville.  The eastern end is at the Southwest Madison Bike Interchange in Arrowhead Park.  The trail largely parallels U.S. Highway 18 and U.S. Highway 151 between Dodgeville and Fitchburg.

The crushed limestone-surfaced trail runs along the southern borders of Governor Dodge and Blue Mound state parks. The land around the trail is primarily agricultural, but also includes woods, wetlands, prairies, villages, and small cities.

The limestone-surfaced trail is open to hikers, bicyclists, and wheelchair users in late spring, summer, and fall and snowmobilers and cross-country skiers in the winter. The segment between Verona and Madison is blacktopped and also usable by in-line skaters.

The trail receives its name from Military Ridge Road, built by the Army in 1835 to connect Green Bay and Fort Crawford (Prairie du Chien) via Fort Winnebago (Portage).

Most of the trail follows the former Chicago and North Western Railway corridor, which has a grade of only 2 to 5 percent. Between Dodgeville and Mount Horeb it runs along the top of the Military Ridge, the divide between the Wisconsin River watershed to the north and the Pecatonica and Rock River watershed to the south. Between Mount Horeb and Fitchburg, it goes through the Sugar River Valley.

See also
List of bike trails in Wisconsin
List of hiking trails in Wisconsin
Rail trails

Sources

External links

Military Ridge Trail (map)
Wisconsin Department of Natural Resources, Military Ridge Trail

Rail trails in Wisconsin
Chicago and North Western Railway
Protected areas of Dane County, Wisconsin
Protected areas of Iowa County, Wisconsin